The Nordic–Baltic Under-23 Athletics Championships is an annual outdoor combined track and field events competition for athletes under-20 from the Nordic countries (Denmark, Finland, Iceland, Norway, and Sweden) – and the Baltic states (Estonia, Latvia and Lithuania). It is typically held over two days in July or August in even-numbered years. Athletes must be 22 years of age or younger by December 31 of the year the championship is held. The hosting of the event is currently limited to the Nordic nations.

The competition was first held in 1998 as the Nordic Under-23 Athletics Championships, The organisers trialled the involvement of athletes from the Baltic states in 2008 and 2010 before making this a permanent arrangement and including them in the competition name.

Events
The event programme includes six individual track running events, three obstacle events, four jumping events, four throwing events, and two relay events for each sex. Competing nations may enter three athletes per individual event, with the host nation being able to enter a further two wildcard athletes per event. Nations may enter only one team per relay event. Where the number of entries exceeds eight athletes in a track event, then multiple finals are held, with the results of each race being combined for the final placings.

Track running
100 metres, 200 metres, 400 metres, 800 metres, 1500 metres, 5000 metres
Obstacle events
100 metres hurdles (women only), 110 metres hurdles (men only), 400 metres hurdles, 3000 metres steeplechase
Jumping events
Pole vault, high jump, long jump, triple jump
Throwing events
Shot put, discus throw, javelin throw, hammer throw
Relay events
4 × 100 metres relay, 4 × 400 metres relay

Editions

See also
European Athletics U23 Championships
SELL Student Games

References

Editions
Competition Venues. Nordic Athletics. Retrieved 2019-08-13.

Nordic Athletics Championships
Recurring sporting events established in 1998
1998 establishments in Finland
Under-23 athletics competitions
Inter-Nordic sports competitions
International athletics competitions